The year 1910 in architecture involved some significant architectural events and new buildings.

Events
 January 21 – Architect Adolf Loos delivers the lecture Ornament and Crime in Vienna.
 April 27 – Futurist poet Filippo Tommaso Marinetti issues the manifesto Contro Venezia passatista ("Against Past-loving Venice") in the Piazza San Marco.
 Mary Colter is appointed full-time architect for the Fred Harvey Company in the United States.

Buildings and structures

Buildings opened
 January 22 – Flinders Street railway station in Melbourne, Australia, designed by Fawcett and Ashworth.
 February – Birmingham Oratory in Birmingham, England, designed by Edward Doran Webb.
 May 11 – Pan American Union Building, Washington, D.C., designed by Paul Philippe Cret and Albert Kelsey.
 June – Abdulla Shaig Puppet Theatre in Baku, Azerbaijan.
 July 31 – Split Rock Lighthouse, Minnesota, designed by Ralph Russell Tinkham.
 August 5 – Pilgrim Monument, Boston, Massachusetts, designed by Willard T. Sears.
 November 27 – Pennsylvania Station (New York City), designed by McKim, Mead and White.

Buildings completed
 The Renauld Bank in Nancy, designed by Émile André and Paul Charbonnier.
 The Ducret Apartment Building in Nancy, designed by André and Charbonnier.
 Casa Milà in Barcelona, designed by Antoni Gaudí.
 Goldman & Salatsch Building (the "Looshaus"), Michaelerplatz, Vienna, designed by Adolf Loos.
 Steiner House in Vienna, designed by Adolf Loos.
 Jacir Palace Hotel in Bethlehem.
 Gereonshaus in Cologne, designed by Carl Moritz.
 National Museum of Finland, Helsinki, designed by Herman Gesellius, Armas Lindgren and Eliel Saarinen.
 Liberty Tower (Manhattan) in New York, designed by Henry Ives Cobb.
 Giesshübel warehouse in Zürich, Switzerland, designed by Robert Maillart.

Awards
 RIBA Royal Gold Medal – Thomas Graham Jackson.
 Grand Prix de Rome, architecture: Fernand Janin.

Births
 May 23 – Sir Hugh Casson, British architect, interior designer, artist, influential writer and broadcaster (died 1999)
 June 26 – Maciej Nowicki, Polish architect, chief architect of the new Indian city of Chandigarh (died 1950)
 July 2 – Richard Sheppard, English architect specializing in educational buildings (died 1982)
 August 7 – Lucien Hervé, Hungarian-born architectural photographer (died 2007)
 August 12 – Eliot Noyes, American architect and industrial designer (died 1977)
 August 20 – Eero Saarinen, Finnish American architect and industrial designer (died 1961), son of Eliel Saarinen

Deaths
 March 13 – Sir Thomas Drew, Irish architect (born 1838)
 May 14 – Gaetano Koch, Italian architect active in Rome (born 1849)
 August 24 – Juste Lisch, French architect (born 1828)

References